The Rodeo Boys were an indie folk-rock band from Salt Lake City that formed in 2001, known for their post-modern lyrical approach and light-hearted collective persona.

History and future
After a nearly ten-year hiatus, it was announced TRB would play a reunion show December 8, 2017 at the Urban Lounge in Salt Lake City.

Albums
They have released the albums Same as Cash (2002) and Flex (2006).

Band members 

George Elliott - guitar, vocals and musical saw
Greg Midgley - bass, keyboards, guitar and vocals
Clayton Scrivner - drums and vocals
Ben Warren- Rhodes piano, keyboards and vocals

Band history 
Eliott, Scrivner and former "TRB" guitarist Brett Ludemann started gigging in Salt Lake City bars in 2001.

Warren joined the band, adding his distinctive Rhodes piano stylings as they began recording their first album, Same as Cash.

Departure of Ludemann
Following the departure of Ludemann in 2004, the band recruited Midgley and began writing their second album, Flex.

The Rodeo Boys have shared the stage with The Radar Brothers, David Pajo, Erase Errata, Inviolet Row, Black Nasty, Pink Nasty, VHS or BETA?, The Numbers, and The Apes.

References
Las Vegas CityLife Review of Flex 2006
Salt Lake City Weekly, January 26, 2006: Class Clowns The Rodeo Boys advance and get (mostly) serious with Flex. by Jamie Gadette
Salt Lake City Weekly, August 28, 2003: 2003 SLAMMys - Who measures up?
[ AllMusic.com: The Rodeo Boys]

External links 
The Rodeo Boys website
The Rodeo Boys MySpace page

Musical groups from Utah
Musical groups established in 2001
2001 establishments in Utah